Tonino Picula (born 31 August 1961) is a Croatian politician currently serving his third term as a Member of the European Parliament for Croatia, having successfully run in 2013, 2014, and 2019 European elections. He got involved in politics in the early 1990s and had served four consecutive terms as a member of the Croatian Parliament, having been elected in 2000, 2003, 2007, and 2011 parliamentary elections as a member of the center-left Social Democratic Party (SDP). He served as Minister of Foreign Affairs from 2000 to 2003 under prime minister Ivica Račan, and as mayor of Velika Gorica from 2005 to 2009.

Picula is a member of the center-left Social Democratic Party (SDP) and sits with the Progressive Alliance of Socialists & Democrats in the European Parliament.

Early life and education 
Picula was born in Mali Lošinj and completed both primary and secondary education in Šibenik, Dalmatia. He graduated sociology at Faculty of humanities and social sciences, University of Zagreb.

Political career

Career in national politics 
After the 2000 parliamentary elections in which SDP, under Ivica Račan, won in a broad coalition, Picula was appointed Minister of Foreign Affairs and served a full term until 2003. During his term in office, Croatia had several important foreign-relation successes, including becoming a candidate for NATO and the European Union and joining World Trade Organization. He signed the Stabilization and Association Agreement on behalf of Croatian government, and submitted the country's application for membership in the EU. After years of negotiations, disagreements and delays he also signed the Agreement on Succession Issues of the Former Socialist Federal Republic of Yugoslavia on behalf of Croatia.

During local elections in 2005, he was elected mayor of Velika Gorica. He also led the SDP branch in Velika Gorica from 1997 to 2000.

Member of the European Parliament, 2013–present

On 1 April 2012, as part of preparations for Croatia's full EU membership, Sabor appointed Picula to the European Parliament as one of the 12 "observer" members from Croatia. At the first Croatian European Parliament elections in 2013, he was elected to the remainder of the Parliament's 2009–2014 term, and then again to two full terms in 2014 and 2019.

Foreign Policy

Picula has been a member of the Committee on Foreign Affairs (AFET) since 2013 where he currently serves as a senior member responsible for coordinating the work of the Socialists and Democrats in the Committee. He is a substitute member of the Delegation for relations with the United States of America (D-US), and as such, in June 2020, had been appointed the European Parliament’s first standing rapporteur for relations with the USA.

Picula has been a strong proponent of the EU enlargement, and has held it is EU’s most successful policy and most powerful tool for promoting democracy, prosperity and peace. In November 2019, AFET appointed him to the position of the Rapporteur for Recommendations on the Western Balkans ahead of the May 2020 Summit in Zagreb. The key recommendations of the Report were to ensure that the improved negotiation methodology has the full EU membership as its ultimate goal and that the EU provides clear and predictable rules and criteria and applies them consistently, thereby restoring its credibility. His dedication to EU – Western Balkans relations is also reflected in his memberships in the Delegation for relations with Bosnia and Herzegovina, and Kosovo (DSEE) as well as in the Delegation for relations with Serbia. In 2019 he was named Co-Rapporteur for IPA III Financial Instrument for Pre-Accession Assistance and Standing Rapporteur on Montenegro. As of January 2020 he is also the Chairman of the Working Group for the Western Balkans, one of the five AFET working groups.

In the current 9th parliamentary term, he was a substitute member in the Subcommittee on Security and Defence (SEDE) in the first half of the term, and a full member of the then newly founded Special Committee on Foreign Interference in all Democratic Processes in the European Union, including Disinformation, and the Delegation to the Euronest Parliamentary Assembly (PA).

Regional Development and Islands Policy

Picula has dedicated much of his parliamentary work to regional development policies with a particular emphasis on European islands. In 2014, he helped establish the European Parliament Intergroup on Seas, Rivers, Islands and Coastal Areas (SEARICA). After serving a full term as its Vice-Chair in charge of islands, he was elected its Chair in 2019. Picula gained prominence as island policy champion when in 2016 he secured 2 million EUR for establishing the Clean Energy for EU Islands (CE4EUI) Secretariat through an amendment to the EU budget. In 2019, Picula proposed two additional amendments worth a total of 4 million euros. After an evaluation by the Commission and lengthy negotiations within the European Parliament and with the Council, Picula secured additional 2 million EUR for the CE4EUI Secretariat, and new 2 million EUR for the same model to be applied to all rural areas. Success of these initiatives led to signing of The Memorandum of Split calling for a long-term framework for cooperation to advance the energy transition for European islands, and the inclusion of the Clean Energy for EU Islands Initiative in the European Green Deal.

Picula has also been appointed EP Rapporteur for cohesion policy commitments on climate change, which will be one of the most important tools in the coming years when it comes to monitoring whether taxpayers' money is really invested in energy and environmentally sustainable projects and businesses. He is a substitute member of the Committee on Regional Development (REGI) and Committee on Agriculture and Rural Development (AGRI), and a member of the European Parliament Intergroup on the Welfare and Conservation of Animals.

Earlier Parliamentary Terms

During the 7th and 8th Parliamentary terms he served as the Chair of the European Parliament delegation for relations with Bosnia and Herzegovina, and Kosovo (2014–2019), substitute member of the Delegation to the EU-Serbia Stabilisation and Association Parliamentary Committee (2014–2019), and was responsible on behalf of the S&D Group for a number of reports such as those on the Accession Agreements with Ukraine and with Northern Macedonia, and the European Defence Union. He was briefly a substitute member of Committee on Petitions (PETI), and Delegation to the Parliamentary Assembly of the Union for the Mediterranean in 2013 and 2014. From 2014 until 2017, he was also a member of the Subcommittee on Security and Defence (SEDE).

Recognition 
In 2017, The Water Saving Project, initiated and coordinated with the European Small Island Federation and funded by MEP Picula, was awarded the “Greening the Islands Award”. The project aimed at taking action at the other end of the water problem: instead of encouraging water production, it aimed to reduce the use of freshwater through clever communication, smart engineering and wise governance, keeping in mind possible disadvantages such measures might have on people and businesses. The project initially gathered 8 islands from 4 different EU member states: Lastovo and Vis from Croatia, Houat and Sein from France, Ithaka and Tilos from Greece, Cape Clear and Inis Oirr from Ireland.

In 2018, Picula was voted “MEP of the year” by the European Small Island Federation, an organization representing 359,000 islanders on 1,640 small European islands.

In 2020, Picula was nominated for the Energy Award by the Parliament Magazine.

References

External links
 
 Biography at Javno.com

1961 births
Living people
People from Mali Lošinj
Social Democratic Party of Croatia politicians
Foreign ministers of Croatia
Mayors of places in Croatia
Croatian diplomats
Faculty of Humanities and Social Sciences, University of Zagreb alumni
MEPs for Croatia 2013–2014
Social Democratic Party of Croatia MEPs
MEPs for Croatia 2014–2019
MEPs for Croatia 2019–2024